Yebin or Ye-bin is a Korean feminine given name. It is an indigenous Korean language name, meaning that it is not composed from Sino-Korean morphemes and is  not written in hanja. However it is incidentally homophonous with the Sino-Korean word  meaning "etiquette". People with this name include:

Yebin Mok (born 1984), South Korean-born American figure ice skater
Yoo Ye-bin (born 1992), South Korean beauty queen
Baek Ye-bin (born 1997), South Korean singer, member of girl group DIA

See also
List of Korean given names

References

Korean feminine given names